Leni is a comune (municipality) and one of the main towns on Salina, one of the Aeolian Islands, in the Metropolitan City of Messina, Sicily, southern Italy.

Leni borders the following municipalities: Malfa, Santa Marina Salina.

People
 Nino Randazzo (born 1932)

References

External links
 Official website

Cities and towns in Sicily
Towns and villages in the Aeolian Islands